Félix Lecomte (1737, Paris – 1817, Paris) was a French sculptor in the second half of the eighteenth century.

In 1758 he won the Prix de Rome scholarship in sculpture and attended class in Rome from 1761 to 1768.  When he returned to Paris, he was accepted by the Academy thanks especially to his group sculpture in marble Œdipe et Phorbas (Oedipus and Phorbas). He was elected to the French Academy in 1771.

References

 Schwartz, Emmanuel (2003) Les Sculptures de l'École des Beaux-Arts de Paris: Histoire, doctrines, catalogue École nationale supérieure des Beaux-Arts, Paris, 
 Langmuir, Erika and Lynton, Norbert (2000) "Lecomte, Felix (1737-1817)" The Yale Dictionary of Art and Artists Yale University Press, New Haven, CT,

External links
 

18th-century French sculptors
French male sculptors
19th-century French sculptors
Prix de Rome for sculpture
1737 births
1814 deaths
19th-century French male artists
18th-century French male artists